China National Highway 106 (G106; , 106 Guo Dao) is a road from Beijing to Guangzhou.

It leaves Beijing at Yuquanying and heads to Gu'an County, Bazhou (Hebei), Kaifeng (Henan), Ezhou (Hubei), and eventually Guangzhou (Guangdong) on the south China coast.

Within the Huangshi prefecture-level city In eastern Hubei (from near Ezhou and to the Jiangxi border), G106 coincides with G316.

Route and distance

See also
 China National Highways

References

106
Transport in Guangzhou
Road transport in Beijing
Transport in Henan
Transport in Hubei
Transport in Guangdong
Transport in Hunan
Transport in Hebei
Transport in Shandong